A cafeteria plan or cafeteria system is a type of employee benefit plan offered in the United States pursuant to Section 125 of the Internal Revenue Code.  Its name comes from the earliest such plans that allowed employees to choose between different types of benefits, similar to the ability of a customer to choose among available items in a cafeteria.  Qualified cafeteria plans are excluded from gross income.  To qualify, a cafeteria plan must allow employees to choose from two or more benefits consisting of cash or qualified benefit plans. The Internal Revenue Code explicitly excludes deferred compensation plans from qualifying as a cafeteria plan subject to a gross income exemption.  Section 125 also provides two exceptions.

If the cafeteria plan discriminates in favor of highly compensated employees, the highly compensated employees will be required to report their cafeteria plan benefits as income.  The second exception is that if "the statutory nontaxable benefits provided to key employees exceed 25 percent of the aggregate of such benefits provided for all employees under the plan," then the key employees must report their cafeteria plan benefits as income. Effective January 1, 2011, eligible employers meeting contribution requirements and eligibility and participation requirements can establish a "simple" cafeteria plan. Simple cafeteria plans are treated as meeting the nondiscrimination requirements of a cafeteria plan and certain benefits under a cafeteria plan.

History
The Cafeteria Benefits Plan resulted from Thomas Ellsworth Wood of Hewitt Associates and chairman of the Corporate Board for the International Foundation of Employee Benefit Plans. Wood, who once said "one universal benefit program can no longer do the job," was the originator of flexible compensation due to the fact American corporations and households were becoming increasingly dynamic and globalized. As quoted in his chapter of the business publication, Business, Work, and Benefits: Adjusting to Change produced by the Employee Benefit Research Institute, "Wood's framework creates a specific detailed picture. The concepts include the establishment of a basic "safety net" of benefits to cover financial hazards associated with old age, death and disability, and catastrophic medical expenses, with supplementary benefits offered on a defined contribution basis". 

Cafeteria plans were added to the Internal Revenue Code in November 1978. Internal Revenue Code Section 125 sets forth the requirements and tax treatment of cafeteria plans. Section 125 has been amended multiple times since its enactment.

In May 2005, the Treasury Department and the Internal Revenue Service announced that, effective immediately, employers would be permitted to design cafeteria plans that enable participants to be reimbursed for claims incurred up to 2½ months after the close of a plan year. Before this notice, reimbursements were permitted only for claims incurred during the plan year. Under the new ruling, an employee who participates in a Flexible Spending Account plan ending December 31 can still receive reimbursement for claims incurred through March 15 if the extended grace period is adopted by the employer.

Since the "use it or lose it" fear of many employees was reduced significantly by the expanded claims reimbursement cycle, and access to funds can now be better targeted for purchases that the employee actually needs, there has been a clear increase in both the percentage of employees opting to participate in a Flex Plan and in the level of annual elections, enhancing FICA savings for employees and employers alike.

Features and benefits
Employees of employers with cafeteria plans may obtain such benefits as health insurance, group-term life insurance, voluntary "supplemental" insurance (dental, vision, cancer, hospital confinement, accident, etc.), and flexible spending accounts through the plan.  Though some cafeteria plans offer an explicit choice of cash or benefits, most today are operated through a "salary redirection agreement", which is a payroll deduction in all but name.  Deductions under such agreements are often called pre-tax deductions. Salary redirection contributions are not actually or constructively received by the participant. Therefore, those contributions are not generally considered wages for federal income tax purposes, nor are they usually subject to Federal Insurance Contributions Act tax (FICA) and Federal Unemployment Tax Act (FUTA).

Reasons for implementing a Section 125 plan are primarily for the tax savings advantages for the employer and employee. Both parties save on taxes and therefore increase their spendable income. Employees' pretax contributions are not subject to federal, state, or social security taxes. Employers save on the employer portion of FICA, FUTA, and workers' compensation insurance premiums. 

A cafeteria plan may permit an employee to revoke an election during a period of coverage and to make a new election only in limited circumstances, such as a change in status event. A change in status event includes changes in the number of an employee's dependents.

Medical expenses eligible for reimbursement under a Section 125 cafeteria plan
The following is a list of common non-prescription over-the-counter items eligible for reimbursement, dual purpose items that may be reimbursable with a physician's statement and items that are not reimbursable. This list is not all-inclusive.

Over-the-counter expenses eligible for reimbursement under a Section 125 cafeteria plan

Eligible expenses 
The following is a list of over-the-counter items the IRS has determined to be primarily for medical care and eligible for reimbursement. Over-the-counter medicines are allowable only with a written recommendation from a physician.

Dual-purpose items
The following list of dual-purpose over-the-counter items can be reimbursed if used for medical purposes. They must be accompanied by a medical practitioner's note stating the item is to treat a
specific medical condition and not a cosmetic procedure.

See also

References

Employee benefits
Taxation in the United States
Fiscal policy